Elie and Earlsferry is a coastal town and former royal burgh in Fife, Scotland.

Elie may also refer to:

People
 Elie (given name)
 Elie (surname)

Places
Elie, Manitoba, Canada
Elie Hall, Grenada
Elie House, country house in Elie, Fife, Scotland

Others
Elie, Manitoba tornado

Name-like
Elie Bleu
Elie Golf Club
Elie Wiesel bibliography

Begins with

See also
Eli (disambiguation)
Elia (disambiguation)
Élie, the French equivalent of "Elias" or "Elijah"
Ellie (disambiguation)
Ely (surname)